Ensen may refer to:

 , a district of Porz, Cologne, Germany
 Ensen tribe, an indigenous people in the Salinas area of California who spoke Rumsen language
 Ensen (album), a 2017 album by Emel Mathlouthi

See also
 Ensign (disambiguation)
 Enson (disambiguation)